Norman Adams (October 3, 1933 in Walla Walla, Washington – July 4, 2014) was an American commercial artist and illustrator.

Biography
Norman Adams began to draw and paint when he was still a child. He collected pictures from every type of magazine and book he could find and then found ways of improving them. He was especially captivated by the trompe-l'œil realism of artists like William Harnett, John F. Peto and John Haberle.

He studied art at the Los Angeles Art Center School in the early 1950s. While he was in Los Angeles he spent months painting a portfolio in which he used his trompe-l'œil realism to convince the managers of the largest illustration agencies in NY that he could do what no other artist/illustrator could. The three largest agencies in NY wanted to hire him. He chose to work for the Charles E Cooper Studio.
While Adams was working in NY he met his idol Robert Fawcett at a Society of Illustrators exhibition.
 
Like most established Illustrators at the time Norman Adams considered Robert Fawcett to be: "The Illustrator's Illustrator." When Norman Adams finally met Robert Fawcett, he, Fawcett, was so impressed with Adams' paintings that he considered Norman to be a Babe Ruth of Illustration, perhaps because Norman worked for the "New York Yankees" of Illustration at the time: the "preeminent" Charles E Cooper Studio.

Another more obvious reason Fawcett might have referred to Adams as Cooper's Babe Ruth was his versatility. When Adams was working for Cooper only Don Crowley could paint realistically enough to be versatile. All of Cooper's other illustrators, like Murray Tinkelman, Coby Whitmore, and James Bama were too specialized to be versatile. Not only were they specialized but they were specialized for so long that they would not do jobs outside their “specialty.”

What separated Adams's paintings from others was the trompe-l'œildetail he routinely put into his paintings. It was this extra detail that made his paintings stand out, especially to professions like Cooper and Fawcett.

Illustrators took for granted that it was a waste of time to put detail into their originals that would be lost in the published reproduction. Adams also knew this, but what he did not take for granted: although much of the trompe-l'œil detail he put into his originals would be lost in reproduction, it was this detail that would get him new jobs that other illustrators would not get. It was all these additional jobs that made him Cooper's “Babe Ruth.”

Adams' illustrations included works for Reader's Digest, Boys' Life, Harpers, National Geographic, TV Guide, Saturday Evening Post, Argosy, Sports Afield, Field and Stream, Business Week, Cabela's, and other paperback covers. He also authored a textbook now in its 30th Edition, Drawing Animals. When the magazines started to fail the Charles E Cooper Studio had to downscale. This prompted Norman Adams to join an elite group of illustrators at Artists Associates.

In 1980 Lenox hired him to do a very limited edition Lenox Collection of 12 unique plates that were released in 1982 called The American Wildlife Plates by Norman Adams. In the mid-1980s, Adams was given an opportunity to paint for the 1988 Minnesota Wildlife Art Show. His work was a life-sized Golden Eagle in a Grand Canyon setting. For years he sold his wildlife and animal paintings in galleries in Scottsdale, Arizona, and Jackson Hole, Wyoming.

References

External links 
 Walla Walla Union Bulletin
 Fort Walla Walla Museum

1933 births
2014 deaths
20th-century American painters
20th-century American male artists
American male painters
21st-century American painters
21st-century American male artists
American illustrators
Animal artists
Trompe-l'œil artists
Painters from New York City
Artists from Walla Walla, Washington
Painters from Washington (state)